The Newlydeads were an industrial rock band founded by Faster Pussycat singer Taime Downe.

At one time or another, The Newlydeads also featured Taime Downe's Faster Pussycat bandmates: guitarist Xristian Simon, bassist Danny Nordahl, and drummer Chad Stewart. They released two full studio albums (The Newlydeads and Dead End), as well as a remix album (Re-Bound) and a compilation album (Dreams from a Dirt Nap).

At one time, the band also featured former Bang Tango bassist Kyle Kyle.  At one time, the band also featured Dish as drummer/percussionist.

The Newlydeads have also contributed to at least two compilation albums.  Their song "Lipstick" appeared on the 2002 release Heat Slick Records Compilation.  The 2007 Cleopatra release Industrial Masters includes The Newlydeads' cover of the Nine Inch Nails song "Terrible Lie," originally featured on the 2000 Cleopotra release Covered in Nails: A Tribute to Nine Inch Nails.

Taime Downe still performs Newlydeads songs with Faster Pussycat.

Discography
The Newlydeads  (1997)
Re-Bound  (1998)
Dead End  (2001)
Dreams from a Dirt Nap (2006)

References

External links
 Official website
 Myspace page

American industrial rock musical groups
Musical groups from California